Kobula  - Mountain in the Ukrainian Carpathians within Rakhiv district of Transcarpathian region.

Its peak height is 1177 meters above sea level. The western, southern and eastern slopes of the mountain are very steep, while the north slope just passes in a gentle continuing ridge that extends north to the Svydovets range. Although its slopes are forested, the top is covered in meadow.

At the foot of the mountain village lie Kobyletska Polyana (northwest) and Kosovska Polyana village (south-east). To the south of the summit is Kobyletska pass.

Legend 
In the village of Polyana Kobyletska there is a legend of its founders. People say that the village was named after the mare that while Robin in the area went to the summit with four bags of gold. Past it were Hungarians, who at that time fought with Opryshky. Opryshky died, and the mare went to the cave with bags of gold and never returned.

Since Kobyletska Polyana village called, and the mountain is called mares.

Tourism 
In the vicinity Mountain Hotel and tourist facilities, built cable car ski type length 500 m.

Each month, the mountain rising 20-30 (sometimes up to 100) tourists. The mountain built a small house for tourists and shepherds and sheep. On the mountain there are still buildings from the time of World War II, which are already beginning to crumble. Example: House for soldiers and dilapidated headquarters of Ukrainian partisans at the end of the mountaintop.

Photos

Notices 

One-thousanders of Ukraine
Mountains of Ukraine